The Volucellini is a tribe of hoverflies.

List of genera 
Copestylum Macquart, 1846
Graptomyza Wiedemann, 1820
Ornidia Lepeletier & Serville, 1828
Volucella Geoffroy, 1762

References 

Eristalinae
Brachycera tribes
 diptera tribes